Notosara acosmeta is a moth in the family Depressariidae. It was described by Ian Francis Bell Common in 1964. It is found in Western Australia.

References

Moths described in 1964
Depressariinae